Joe or Joseph Gallagher may refer to:

Joe Gallagher (baseball) (1914–1998), American baseball player
Joe Gallagher (footballer) (born 1955), British association footballer
Joseph Gallagher (born 1964), British chess grand master
Joe Gallagher (boxing) (born 1968), British former boxer and trainer
Joe Gallagher (hurler), Irish hurler